Yasin Merchant, born 17 December 1966 is India's first professional snooker player. He won the National Snooker championships on 3 occasions, in 2001, 2000 and 1991.  He was honoured by Khar Gymkhana which has named its snooker hall after him as Yasin Merchant Snooker Hall.

Career
In 2011 he retired from the sport.

Tournament finals 
 2010 Silver medallist Asian Games China
 2006 Bronze medallist - Indoor Asian games, Macau
 2007 ACBS Asian Snooker Championship runner-up
 2002 Asian Games – Snooker Doubles Gold Medal
 2001 ACBS Asian Champion, Indian Snooker Champion 
 2000 Indian Snooker Champion 
 1991 ACBS Asian Championship runner-up, Indian Snooker Champion
 1989 ACBS Asian Championship Champion
 1991 Arjuna Award
 1991 Shiv Chattrapati Award
 WPBSA World Snooker Coach Grade 2

References

External links 
 Yasin Merchant's biography

Indian snooker players
1966 births
Living people
Asian Games medalists in cue sports
Cue sports players at the 1998 Asian Games
Cue sports players at the 2002 Asian Games
Cue sports players at the 2006 Asian Games
Cue sports players at the 2010 Asian Games
Asian Games gold medalists for India
Asian Games silver medalists for India
Asian Games bronze medalists for India
Medalists at the 2002 Asian Games
Medalists at the 2006 Asian Games
Medalists at the 2010 Asian Games
Cue sports players from Maharashtra
Recipients of the Arjuna Award